İlhan Şen (born 19 December 1987) is a Turkish actor and former model.

Life and career
Şen was born on 19 December 1987 in Bulgaria to a Turk family. His family was forced to immigrate from Bulgaria to Turkey when he was two years old. 

Since childhood, he played as professional young sportsman in basketball and football clubs (Fenerbahçe, etc.). After finishing his primary and secondary education in Istanbul, he studied in Yıldız Technical University, graduating with a degree in construction engineering.

He started modelling at the age of 17. He participated in the Best Model of Turkey competition in 2008 and received the "Best Swimwear Model" award. In 2009, he was back to the competition and this time he earned the first place and won the "Best Model of Turkey 2009" title. He represented Turkey at the "Best Model of The World 2009" which was held in Sofia, Bulgaria, and became "Best Model of Europe".

After working as a model, he started taking acting lessons and made his debut with a role in the historical drama Mehmed: Bir Cihan Fatihi in 2018. He subsequently appeared in four more supporting roles in Şahin Tepesi (2018), Eşkıya Dünyaya Hükümdar Olmaz (2019), Ramo (2020), and Seni Çok Bekledim (2020). He had leading roles in the romantic comedy series Aşk Mantık İntikam, opposite Burcu Özberk and drama series Sevmek Zamanı.

Filmography

References

External links 
 
 

1987 births
Living people
Turkish male television actors
Turkish male film actors
People from Shumen